Fabric.js is a Javascript HTML5 canvas library. It is a fully open-source project with many contributions over the years.  The library was originally developed in 2010 by Juriy Zaytsev, whom also led the project until 2016. Since 2016, the project is led by Andrea Bogazzi.

External link

References

JavaScript libraries
Web applications
Free and open-source software
Web development